Montans is a commune in the Tarn department and Occitanie region of southern France.

Geography
Situated between Lisle-sur-Tarn and Gaillac, near the A68 autoroute, the village stands at the end of a terrace overlooking the River Tarn. The locality produces wine with the appellation Gaillac AOC.

Name
The name of the settlement is derived from the Occitan word montant, meaning "steep".

History
The site of Montans was occupied by a Gallic oppidum. Already, the Gauls were producing pottery on the site since the environment was favorable with the alluvium covering the terrace containing pockets of clay. Following the Roman occupation, the site became in the beginning of AD one of the most important centers of pottery production in the Gallo-Roman world. The pottery was exported, mostly by water down the Tarn and Garonne rivers all the way to places like Brittany and Great Britain.

Tourism
L'Archéosite is a museum and documentation center, with an exhibition of pottery from Antiquity and a reconstitution of a Gallo-Roman street and shops leading to the potter's house.

On the bank of the Tarn river, Guest houses offer bedrooms and dinners, such as at the Aigue Verte for example.

See also
 Communes of the Tarn department
 Tourism in Tarn

References
Archéosite de Montans 
l'Aigue Verte
 Montans samian ware in Britain 

Communes of Tarn (department)